At least 2 British ships have been named SS Otranto after the Strait of Otranto between Italy and Albania.

 SS Otranto – 1909 ship that served as an armed merchant cruiser and troop ship during World War I before being wrecked in 1918.
  – ocean liner that served during World War II as a troop transport and Landing ship, infantry before she was scrapped in 1957.

Ship names